Anari No. 1 is a 1999 Indian Hindi-language language comedy film directed by Kuku Kohli. The film stars Govinda, Raveena Tandon and Simran in lead roles and Aruna Irani, Kader Khan, Satish Shah and Satyendra Kapoor in supporting roles, with songs composed by Dilip Sen and Sameer Sen.

Plot

Naive Raja (Govinda) is employed as a lowly waiter in a hotel. One day he serves and looks after a wealthy businessman K. K. (Kader Khan), who lends him a suit, and gives him some money, so that he could find a rich woman to woo and marry. Raja thinks Sapna (Raveena Tandon) is wealthy and successfully woos her and wins her heart, only to find out that she too is on the lookout for a rich prince charming. She thought Raja was the rich, debonair, and eligible bachelor Rahul Saxena (Govinda).

With the help of garage owner, Sattarbhai (Satish Shah), all three of them concoct a plot to kidnap Rahul Saxena and hold him for ransom, while Raja takes his place. After kidnapping him, Raja does take his place with Rahul's family, his stepmom, Sharda, dad Dhanraj, uncle, aunt, and sweetheart Sona (Simran). Sona happens to be the daughter of Raja's mentor K. K., and this arouses anger with K. K. when he finds out that Raja has chosen Sona to seduce. Then things start to go wrong as Raja himself gets kidnapped, as he is mistaken for Rahul.

Cast
 Govinda (Double Role) as 
 Rahul Saxena:Raja's brother and Sona's love 
Raja Saxena: Rahul's brother and Sapna's love                  
 Raveena Tandon as Sapna Raja Saxena: Raja's love
 Simran as Sona Rahul Saxena: Rahul's love
 Aruna Irani as Sharda Saxena, Raja and Rahul's mother
 Kader Khan as K.K.
 Adi Irani as Tiger Tadipaar
 Johnny Lever as Galer Mehndi
 Prem Chopra as chacha (Rahul's Uncle)
 Himani Shivpuri as chachee (Rahul's Twins Aunt)
 Satish Shah as Sattarbhai
 Razak Khan as Rajju Tabela (Kidnapper)
 Satyendra Kapoor as Dhanraj Saxena, Raja and Rahul's Twins father
Dinesh Hingoo as Jewellery Shop Owner
 Master Frank Anthony as Bunty

Soundtrack

References

External links 
 

1990s Hindi-language films
1995 films
Films scored by Dilip Sen-Sameer Sen
Films scored by Aadesh Shrivastava
Hindi-language comedy films
Films directed by Kuku Kohli